Red Cross Hospital in Kaunas is the oldest still functioning hospital in the city and in Lithuania.

History
Hospital was founded November 29, 1908.

Around this hospital the  Medical faculty of the Higher Courses (later developed to University of Lithuania) were  established, and until Kaunas Medical University Clinics were built it was main hospital of Kaunas and since 1922 it was teaching hospital of Vytautas Magnus University. Since  closure of University  in Kaunas 1951 it became teaching hospital of Kaunas Medical Institute and since 1989 - Kaunas University of Medicine.

The hospital is located in the Centras elderate on the corner of Laisvės Alėja and Gediminas street,  and Nepriklausomybės square.

References

 Skirmantas Juozas Paukštys, Kaunas: Raudonojo Kryžiaus klinikinė ligoninė. Arx Baltica, Kaunas. 2006. 126p.

Hospitals in Kaunas
Hospitals in Lithuania
Teaching hospitals
Hospitals established in 1908
1908 establishments in the Russian Empire